Soulsby may refer to:
Ben Soulsby, lumbermill owner and founder of Soulsbyville, California, USA
Heidi Soulsby, British politician from Guernsey
Henry Soulsby, builder of the 1926 Soulsby Service Station on U.S. Route 66 in Mount Olive, Illinois.
James Soulsby (1897–1980), English footballer
Lawson Soulsby, Baron Soulsby of Swaffham Prior (1926–2017), British microbiologist and parasitologist 
Sir Peter Soulsby (born 1948), British politician, Mayor of Leicester
Sir William Soulsby (1851–1937), English barrister, Private Secretary to the Lord Mayor of London

Surnames of British Isles origin
Surnames of English origin
English-language surnames